"Bella Bella" is a song by Swiss singer Luca Hänni. It was written by Hänni alongside Frazer Mac, Jon and Lukas Hällgren, Laurell Barker and Pele Loriano. The song was released on 6 September 2019 by Muve Recordings. A music video to accompany the release of "Bella Bella" was first released onto YouTube on 12 September 2019.

Track listing

Personnel
Credits adapted from Tidal.
 Jon Hällgren – Producer, composer, lyricist, mixer
 Lukas Hällgren – Producer, composer, lyricist
 Pele Loriano – Producer, composer, lyricist, mixer
 Frazer Mac – Composer, lyricist
 Laurell Barker – Composer, lyricist
 Luca Hänni – Composer, lyricist

Charts

Release history

References

2019 singles
Luca Hänni songs
Songs written by Lukas Hällgren
Songs written by Laurell (singer)
Songs written by Luca Hänni